Hawassa Airport (Aw'asa)  is Sub Ethiopian Airlines which serves in  Hawassa, Sidama Region, Ethiopia. The construction of the airport started at the beginning of 2015.

Airlines and destinations

See also
 List of airports in Ethiopia
 Transport in Ethiopia

References

External links
 OurAirports - Ethiopia
 Awasa
 Terminal design video

Airports in Ethiopia
Sidama Region